Leucoptera, "white-winged" in Latin, may refer to:

Leucoptera (plant), a genus of plants in the family Asteraceae
Leucoptera (moth), a genus of moths
Punta di Pellaro also known as Leucoptera, is the extreme southwestern point of mainland Italy, in the region of Calabria

pt:Leucoptera